Monserrat Alarcón (born 7 March 1994) is a Mexican professional boxer. She is a world champion in two weight classes, having held the WBA female light minimumweight title since 2018 and previously the WBO female flyweight title from 2017 to 2018. As of May 2020, she is ranked as the world's best active female light minimumweight by BoxRec.

Professional career
Alarcón made her professional debut on 3 November 2012, scoring a four-round unanimous decision (UD) victory against Perla Perez at the Foro Polanco in Mexico City, Mexico.

After compiling a record of 5–2–1, she faced Brenda Ramos for the vacant Mexican female minimumweight title on 25 March 2015 at the Arena El Jefe in Monterrey, Mexico. Alarcón defeated Ramos, capturing her first professional title via UD over ten rounds. The first defence of her title came six months later against Mitzi Rodriguez on 12 September in Mexico City. Alarcón retained her title through a second-round technical draw after both fighters suffered cuts from an accidental clash of heads.

Following a UD win against Ana Cristina Vargas in a non-title fight in April 2016, she faced former foe Alondra Garcia for the vacant WBC Youth female light flyweight title on 4 June at the Gimnasio Usos Múltiples UdeG in Guadalajara, Mexico. Alarcón suffered the third defeat of her career, losing by majority decision (MD) over ten rounds. Two judges scored the bout 98–94 and 96–94 in favour of Garcia while the third scored it even at 95–95.

In her next fight she successfully defended her Mexican title in a rematch with Brenda Ramos in October before challenging WBO female flyweight champion, Nana Yoshikawa, on 29 April 2017 at the Big-i in Sakai, Japan. In a fight which saw Alarcón drop Yoshikawa twice, once in the opening round and again in the fourth, the bout came to an end in the seventh after Yoshikawa received a cut from an accidental clash of heads and was deemed unable to continue. With the result resting on the scorecards, Alarcón won by unanimous technical decision (TD) with scores of 70–62, 69–63 and 68–64. After a UD win in a non-title fight against Yesenia Martinez Castrejon in December, she made the first defence of her title against former two-time world champion Arely Muciño on 17 February 2018 at the Domo del Parque San Rafael in Guadalajara. Alarcón lost her title via MD, with two judges scoring the bout 99–91 and 98–92 in favour of Muciño while the third scored it even at 95–95.

For her next fight she dropped down in weight to face Mayela Perez for the vacant WBA female atomweight title on 31 August 2018 at the Arena Pavillón del Norte in Saltillo, Mexico. Alarcón captured her second world title in as many weight classes, defeating Perez via UD with two judges scoring the bout 96–94 and the third scoring it 99–91.

Professional boxing record

References

Living people
1994 births
Mexican women boxers
Atomweight boxers
Mini-flyweight boxers
Light-flyweight boxers
Flyweight boxers
World Boxing Association champions
World Boxing Organization champions